Anvil Pond is a freshwater frozen pond to the west of Healy Trough and  northwest of Rodriquez Pond in the Labyrinth of Wright Valley in the McMurdo Dry Valleys. The name was suggested by a United States Antarctic Program field party, 2003–04, because a rock in this small pond looks like an anvil.

References 

Lakes of Victoria Land
McMurdo Dry Valleys